Tiruppadaimarathur Conservation Reserve is an IUCN Category V protected bird nesting area in the  compound of Siva temple in Tiruppadaimarathur village, Tirunelveli District, Tamil Nadu, South India. It was declared  14 February 2005 and is the first Conservation Reserve to be established in India.

Management
The village community and Tamil Nadu Forest Department manage the area. Community participation and public support is crucial for any conservation effort to succeed.  Amendments to the Wild life Protection Act in 2003, provided a mechanism to provide recognition and legal backing to community initiated efforts in wildlife protection. It provides for a flexible system wherein wildlife conservation is achieved without compromising community needs. Tiruppadaimarathur Conservation Reserve is the result of the village community coming forward to protect the birds nesting in their village and acting for declaration of a conservation reserve. This reserve was declared by Government of Tamil Nadu G.O.Ms. No.17 Environment and Forests Dept.

Fauna and flora

Over 400 little egrets, pond heron and near threatened painted stork nest in this grove of 20 huge, century-old  maruthu, mahwa, neem and illuppai trees and feed in the many agricultural fields, a few ponds and the Tamiraparani River adjacent to it. Pond heron and egrets also nesting in backyards of few village houses, while painted storks are only around the temple. Spot-billed pelicans also come for refuge but are not nesting.

References

IUCN Category V
Protected areas of Tamil Nadu
Tirunelveli district
2005 establishments in Tamil Nadu
Protected areas established in 2005